The Negro Major League (NML), also called the Negro Major Baseball League of America, was one of the several Negro baseball leagues created during the time organized baseball was segregated. The NML was organized in 1942 by Abe Saperstein and Syd Pollock after disagreements with owners in the Negro American League and Negro National League.  Pollock brought with him from Miami the Ethiopian Clowns and based them in Cincinnati.

However, some NAL and NNL officials, including Cum Posey, believed Saperstein's new league was not meant to advance Negro baseball, but to be used for Saperstein's own benefit.  After the first season, Pollock shifted the Clowns over to the more stable NAL.  The NML lasted one season with very little media coverage before collapsing.

Teams 

The Negro Major League consisted of nine teams.  No league standing were published. The Chicago Brown Bombers claimed the Negro Major League title in the media with a purported record of 26–6 for a .813 win percentage.

 Baltimore Black Orioles
 Baltimore Grays
 Boston Royal Giants
 Chicago Brown Bombers
 Detroit Black Sox
 Philadelphia Daisies
 Ethiopian Clowns
 Minneapolis-St. Paul Gophers
 Nashville Stars

References 

Negro baseball leagues
Defunct baseball leagues in the United States
African-American sports history
Sports leagues established in 1942
Sports leagues disestablished in 1942
Defunct professional sports leagues in the United States
Baseball leagues in Maryland
Baseball leagues in Illinois
Baseball leagues in Pennsylvania
Baseball leagues in Tennessee
Baseball leagues in Minnesota
Baseball leagues in Massachusetts
Baseball leagues in Michigan